The canton of Brienne-le-Château is an administrative division of the Aube department, northeastern France. Its borders were modified at the French canton reorganisation which came into effect in March 2015. Its seat is in Brienne-le-Château.

It consists of the following communes:
 
Arrembécourt
Assencières
Aulnay
Bailly-le-Franc
Balignicourt
Bétignicourt
Blaincourt-sur-Aube
Blignicourt
Bouy-Luxembourg
Braux
Brévonnes
Brienne-la-Vieille
Brienne-le-Château
Chalette-sur-Voire
Chavanges
Courcelles-sur-Voire
Dienville
Donnement
Dosches
Épagne
Géraudot
Hampigny
Jasseines
Joncreuil
Juvanzé
Lassicourt
Lentilles
Lesmont
Magnicourt
Maizières-lès-Brienne
Mathaux
Mesnil-Sellières
Molins-sur-Aube
Montmorency-Beaufort
Onjon
Pars-lès-Chavanges
Pel-et-Der
Perthes-lès-Brienne
Piney
Précy-Notre-Dame
Précy-Saint-Martin
Radonvilliers
Rances
Rosnay-l'Hôpital
Rouilly-Sacey
Saint-Christophe-Dodinicourt
Saint-Léger-sous-Brienne
Saint-Léger-sous-Margerie
Unienville
Val-d'Auzon
Vallentigny
Villeret
Yèvres-le-Petit

References

Cantons of Aube